St. Therese High School, Belthangady is a coeducational and aided by state govt high school located in the locality of Belthangady, India, adjacent to St. Theresa PU College and St. Theresa Convent, Belthangady. The St. Theresa Educational institutions are run by Ursuline Franciscan Congregation nuns, Belthangady. It was founded on 1 June 1965 by Rev. Fr. Elias P. Dias.

History
St. Theresa Girls High School was begun by Fr. Elias P. Dias on 1 June 1965. Fr. Elias P. Dias was a zealous priest who served the Most Holy Redeemer Church (Belthangady) for seven years during 1960. He opened St. Theresa Girls High School as he believed that women empowerment begins with education. The nuns of the Ursuline Franciscan Congregation were entrusted with the duties of managing the school. Later St. Theresa Girls High School changed to coeducation and changed the name to St. Theresa High School.

The nuns of Ursuline Franciscan Congregation are also managing at St. Theresa Composite Pre University College. They are also engaged in social service, helping the poor, and counselling the troubled families.

See also
Church Higher Primary School, Belthangady
Most Holy Redeemer Church (Belthangady)
Deanery of Belthangady
Belthangady
Ursuline Franciscan Congregation
Monsignor Ambrose Madtha

References

Catholic secondary schools in India
High schools and secondary schools in Karnataka
Christian schools in Karnataka
Schools in Dakshina Kannada district
Educational institutions established in 1965
1965 establishments in Mysore State
Ursuline schools